BCLS may refer to:

Libraries
Bartow County Library System in Bartow County, Georgia
Bay County Library System in Bay County, Michigan
Burlington County Library in Burlington County, New Jersey

Misc.
BC Liquor Stores, a chain of liquor stores servicing British Columbia